Xieji is a town of Liangyuan District, in the northwestern suburbs of Shangqiu, Henan, People's Republic of China, located about  from the border with Shandong. , it has 25 villages under its administration.

See also
List of township-level divisions of Henan

References

Township-level divisions of Henan
Shangqiu